Wayne Mitchell Baker (born July 7, 1953) is a former American football defensive tackle who played for the San Francisco 49ers of the National Football League (NFL). He played college football at BYU.

References 

Living people
American football defensive tackles
BYU Cougars football players
1953 births
San Francisco 49ers players
People from Sandpoint, Idaho
Players of American football from Idaho